Ricardo A. David, Jr is a former Chief of staff of the Philippine Armed Forces. He was the Armed Forces Northern Luzon Command chief. On June 30, 2010, President Benigno Aquino III picked David as his AFP chief. On July 2, 2010, Ricardo David assumes the command of the Armed Forces of the Philippines from Lt Gen. Nestor Z Ochoa. He currently serves as the Undersecretary for Defense Policy of the Department of National Defense.

Background

He was born in 1955 in San Fernando, Pampanga, but spent most of his childhood in Victoria, Tarlac.

He took up his primary education in Dolores Elementary School of Dolores, San Fernando, Pampanga and he graduated at the top of his class in 1967. He graduated from Victoria High School in Tarlac as the Salutatorian of his class in 1971. Upon graduating high school, he took up undergraduate studies in engineering at St. Louis University in Baguio City on a full scholarship program. After a couple of years of studies, he traded one scholarship program for another when he took his Oath as a Cadet of the Philippine Military Academy on April 1, 1973; He graduated from the Philippine Military Academy on March 1, 1977.

Military career
He was the Commanding Officer of the 50th Infantry Battalion of the 5th Infantry Division from December 1996 to April 1998. He also became the Commanding General of the 402nd Infantry Brigade of the 4th Infantry Division from March 2005 to December 2006. This was followed by his assignment to the AFP Command Center until August 2007. Afterwards, he commanded the Army Support Command until April 2008, then the 4th Infantry Division until June 2009 and from there to the AFP Northern Luzon Command up to the time he became the Chief of Staff, Armed Forces of the Philippines on July 2, 2010.

Awards
  Philippine Republic Presidential Unit Citation
  Martial Law Unit Citation
  People Power I Unit Citation
  People Power II Unit Citation
  Distinguished Service Stars
  - Philippine Legion of Honor, Degree of Officer & Chief Commander
  Outstanding Achievement Medal
  Gawad sa Kaunlaran
  Bronze Cross Medals
 Military Merit Medals
  Silver Wing Medal
  Military Commendation Medals
  Military Civic Action Medals
  Sagisag ng Ulirang Kawal
  Long Service Medal
  Anti-dissidence Campaign Medal 
  Luzon Anti-Dissidence Campaign Medal
  Mindanao Anti-Dissidence Campaign Medal
  Disaster Relief and Rehabilitation Operations Ribbon
  Combat Commander's Badge
  AFP Parachutist Badge 
  Philippine Army Command and General Staff Course Badge
 PAF Gold Wings Badge

AFP Chief of staff

In Gen. David's change-of-command ceremony speech, David reminded his soldiers to keep the military as a "disciplined institution."

He said: "We shall continue to be a responsible instrument of public policy, subservient to civilian authority,"

Family
He is married to Merilou Malacay of Cagayan de Oro City and they have two sons, Russel David and Rommel David.

References

 

Living people
Filipino generals
Chairmen of the Joint Chiefs (Philippines)
People from San Fernando, Pampanga
People from Tarlac
Benigno Aquino III administration personnel
Philippine Military Academy alumni
Saint Louis University (Philippines) alumni
Year of birth missing (living people)